Bruce Harrison may refer to:

Edgar Pangborn (1909–1976), American writer who was published under the pseudonym of Bruce Harrison
E. Bruce Harrison (1932–2021), American public relations expert in anti-environmental legislation